Þorsteins saga hvíta is one of the sagas of Icelanders from the 13th century. The short story takes place in the east of Iceland in the 9th century. 
The main theme of the story is about the tragic consequences of the vengeance of Torstein Kvite (Þorsteinn hvíti) on his former friend Einarr Þórisson, who had spread rumors that he was dead in order to be able to marry Torstein's fiancée Helga Krákadóttir.

References

Other sources
Jónas Kristjánsson (1997) Eddas and Sagas: Iceland's Medieval Literature  (Reykjavik: Hið íslenska bókmenntafélag. Peter Foote, trans)

Related reading
Jesse Byock (1993) Feud in the Icelandic Saga (University of California Press)

External links
Full text and translations at the Icelandic Saga Database
Proverbs and proverbial materials in Þorsteins saga Hvíta

Sagas of Icelanders